Arrowsmithia styphelioides is a species of flowering plant in the family Asteraceae. It is endemic to the Cape Province region of South Africa.

References

Endemic flora of South Africa
Gnaphalieae